Taivoan or Taivuan may refer to:

 the Taivoan people
 the Taivoan language